Hughes Ice Piedmont is the ice piedmont between Cordini Glacier and Smith Inlet on the east coast of Palmer Land, Antarctica. It was named by the Advisory Committee on Antarctic Names for Terence J. Hughes, a United States Antarctic Research Program glaciologist at Deception Island and McMurdo Sound during 1970–71, and at Deception Island, 1973–74.

See also
Graham Spur

References

Ice piedmonts of Palmer Land